Ralls County is a county located in the northeastern portion of the U.S. state of Missouri. As of the 2020 census, the population was 10,355. Its county seat is New London. The county was organized November 16, 1820 and named for Daniel Ralls, Missouri state legislator.

Ralls County is part of the Hannibal, MO Micropolitan Statistical Area, which is also included in the Quincy-Hannibal, IL-MO Combined Statistical Area.

History
Ralls County was one of several along the Mississippi River settled in the early years primarily by European-American migrants from the Upper South, especially Kentucky and Tennessee. They brought slaves and slaveholding traditions with them, and quickly started cultivating crops similar to those in Middle Tennessee and Kentucky: hemp and tobacco. They also brought characteristic antebellum architecture and culture. Ralls is considered one of the counties in the outer ring of what is called the Little Dixie region. Most of the Little Dixie counties are located further west along the Missouri River, from Callaway County west.

Geography

Adjacent counties
Marion County (north)
Pike County, Illinois (northeast)
Pike County (southeast)
Audrain County (south)
Monroe County (west)

Major highways
 Interstate 72 (proposed)
 U.S. Route 24
 U.S. Route 36
 U.S. Route 54
 U.S. Route 61
 U.S. Route 61 Business
 Route 19
 Route 79
 Route 154
 Great River Road

Demographics

As of the census of 2010, there were 10,167 people, 3,736 households, and 2,783 families residing in the county.  The population density was 20 people per square mile (8/km2).  There were 4,564 housing units at an average density of 10 per square mile (4/km2).  The racial makeup of the county was 97.93% White, 1.11% Black or African American, 0.20% Native American, 0.08% Asian, 0.01% Pacific Islander, 0.04% from other races, and 0.62% from two or more races. Approximately 0.44% of the population were Hispanic or Latino of any race. 30.1% were of American, 27.3% German, 10.5% English and 10.4% Irish ancestry.

There were 3,736 households, out of which 34.00% had children under the age of 18 living with them, 64.20% were married couples living together, 6.50% had a female householder with no husband present, and 25.50% were non-families. 21.20% of all households were made up of individuals, and 10.00% had someone living alone who was 65 years of age or older.  The average household size was 2.55 and the average family size was 2.95.

In the county, the population was spread out, with 25.20% under the age of 18, 7.10% from 18 to 24, 26.90% from 25 to 44, 26.50% from 45 to 64, and 14.20% who were 65 years of age or older.  The median age was 39 years. For every 100 females, there were 100.90 males.  For every 100 females age 18 and over, there were 98.90 males.

The median income for a household in the county was $37,094, and the median income for a family was $41,955. Males had a median income of $28,139 versus $20,238 for females. The per capita income for the county was $16,456.  About 6.60% of families and 8.70% of the population were below the poverty line, including 9.70% of those under age 18 and 10.70% of those age 65 or over.

2020 Census

Education

Public schools
 Ralls County R-II School District – Center
Ralls County Elementary School (PK-05)
Mark Twain Junior High School (06-08)
Mark Twain High School (09-12)

Public libraries
 Ralls County Library

Politics

Local
Historically, the Democratic Party predominantly controlled politics at the local level in Ralls County.  However, all local seats up for election with a Republican candidate during the November 2016 election cycle were won by Republicans.  Republicans now hold the office of Sheriff, Coroner, and Western District Commissioner.

State

Ralls County is a part of Missouri's 40h District in the Missouri House of Representatives and is represented by 
Jim Hansen (R-Frankford).

Ralls County is a part of Missouri's 18th District in the Missouri Senate and is currently represented by Brian Munzlinger (R-Williamstown).

Federal

Ralls County is included in Missouri's 6th Congressional District and is currently represented by Sam Graves (R-Tarkio) in the U.S. House of Representatives.

Missouri presidential preference primary (2008)

Former U.S. Senator Hillary Clinton (D-New York) received more votes, a total of 823, than any candidate from either party in Ralls County during the 2008 presidential primary.

Communities

Cities
Center
Hannibal (mostly in Marion County)
Monroe City (mostly in Monroe County and partly in Marion County)
New London (county seat)
Perry

Village
Rensselaer

Unincorporated communities

Cincinnati
Flint Hill
Greenlawn
Hassard
Hatch
Huntington
Hutchison
Ilasco
Madisonville
Salt River
Saverton
Sheil
Spalding
West Hartford

See also
National Register of Historic Places listings in Ralls County, Missouri

References

External links
 Digitized Historical Photos of Ralls County from Digital online collection of public domain photos Photos of historical Hannibal, Mississippi River scenes in Ralls County, historical Saint Paul and Saint Peter's Brush Creek Cemeteries in Ralls County, Missouri
 Digitized 1930 Plat Book of Ralls County  from University of Missouri Division of Special Collections, Archives, and Rare Books

 
1820 establishments in Missouri Territory
Populated places established in 1820
Little Dixie (Missouri)
Hannibal, Missouri micropolitan area
Missouri counties on the Mississippi River